Andrei Petrovich Dyomkin (born 21 February 1976) is a Russian former footballer.

External links
 

1976 births
Footballers from Moscow
Living people
Russian footballers
Russia under-21 international footballers
Association football forwards
Russian expatriate footballers
Expatriate footballers in Belgium
FC Dynamo Moscow players
Russian Premier League players
R.S.C. Anderlecht players
K.V. Kortrijk players
Beerschot A.C. players
K.S.K. Beveren players
FC Tom Tomsk players
FC Sibir Novosibirsk players
FC Sheksna Cherepovets players
FC MVD Rossii Moscow players